The 2017 Ukrainian Super Cup became the 14th edition of Ukrainian Super Cup, an annual season opener football match contested by the winners of the previous season's Ukrainian Top League and Ukrainian Cup competitions.

The match was played at the Chornomorets Stadium, Odessa, on 15 July 2017 and contested by league and cup winner Shakhtar Donetsk and league and cup runner-up Dynamo Kyiv.

Preparations and other background events
On 13 July 2017 Volodymyr Heninson pointed out to the fact that since 1998 UEFA Super Cup takes place in Monaco which is also a port city and, thus, the "Ukrainian Premier League moves in the stream of the European traditions". As an additional argument why Odessa was chosen as the Ukrainian Super Cup place, the President of UPL stated that football was brought to the Russian Empire through Odessa by the British sailors.

For the first time there will be used the 360-degree video technology for broadcasting of game by channels "Futbol 1" / "Futbol 2" with help of "Limelight, 360discoVR". The game will be broadcast on the "Ukrayina" television channel as well. The game will be commented by Andriy Malynovskyi, while among the studio guests there will be Oleksandr Holovko and Vyacheslav Shevchuk. At the mid-game show will feature cheerleaders competition and concert of Ukrainian singer Yarmak. On 14–15 July 2017 there are planned number of mass events by Ukrainian Premier League among which will be a  running race "Probih UPL" that will take place in the morning of the game day.

Originally appointed referee Anatoliy Zhabchenko was replaced by Kostiantyn Trukhanov on a personal request.

Previous encounters 

Before this game both teams met in the Ukrainian Super Cup nine times, the first being back in 2004. Before this game out of the previous nine Shakhtar won 2 games and Dynamo won 2, five more games were tied and led to penalty shootout three of which were won by Dynamo and two were won by Shakhtar.

Match

Details

Statistics

Notes

References

2017
2017–18 in Ukrainian football
FC Dynamo Kyiv matches
FC Shakhtar Donetsk matches
Sport in Odesa